Operación 90 (Operation NINETY) was the first Argentine ground expedition to the South Pole, conducted in 1965, by ten soldiers of the Argentine Army under then-Colonel Jorge Edgard Leal. It was performed to attempt to cement Argentina's claims to a portion of Antarctica, as well as for scientific reasons and to perfect polar exploration techniques. The operation was named after the target: 90 degree South latitude point (the geographic South Pole). It remains the only documented breach of the provisions of the 1959 Antarctic Treaty, which prohibits any military activity on the continent.

Leal's team departed on six snowcat vehicles (believed to be Tucker Sno-Cats based on the spelling used) from General Belgrano Army Base on October 26, 1965. The main group was preceded by a scouting four-men patrol on a sled drawn by 18 dogs. While the scouts remained at 83° 2″ S, Leal and his men reached the geographic South Pole on December 10. They then returned to Base Belgrano, which they reached on December 31. Overall, the mission lasted 66 days.

The operation was performed in secret so as not to upset the superpowers of the time: the United States, and the Soviet Union. The main purpose of the expedition was to exercise the claimed rights of Argentina to the continuation of its landmass, which (along with almost the entire Western Hemisphere, including the US and Canada) had been proclaimed as a Spanish entitlement by Pope Alexander VI in 1493 through the Treaty of Tordesillas.

General Leal and his men, shortly after arriving to the South Pole, were met by a radar operator from the US Amundsen–Scott South Pole Station, who asked them who they were and what they were doing there. After Leal explained that they were not Soviets, the group was invited to take a meal at the American sub-snow base: the first decent food, said Leal, that the group had in some weeks.

References

External links
  Interview with General Jorge E. Leal
  Fundación Marambio

Non-combat military operations involving Argentina
History of Antarctica
1965 in Argentina
1965 in Antarctica
Military in Antarctica
Argentina and the Antarctic
Antarctic expeditions
Argentina–United States relations
South Pole